Frozen City is a 2006 Finnish drama film directed by Aku Louhimies.

Cast
Janne Virtanen - Veli-Matti
Susanna Anteroinen - Hanna
Aada Hämes - Aada
Santtu Nuutinen - Santtu
Viivi Hämes - Viivi
Jari Pehkonen - Seppo

Awards
 Frozen city won five Jussi Awards (2007):Best director, best actor, best actress, best screenplay and best editing.

References

External links
 

2006 drama films
2006 films
Finnish drama films